Massachusetts Senate's 1st Plymouth and Bristol district in the United States is one of 40 legislative districts of the Massachusetts Senate. It covers 15.1% of Bristol County and 17.8% of Plymouth County population. Democrat Marc Pacheco of Taunton has represented the district since 1993.

Locales represented
The district includes the following localities:
 Berkley
 Bridgewater
 Carver
 Dighton
 Marion
 Middleborough
 Raynham
 Taunton
 Wareham

Senators 
 Marc R. Pacheco, 1993-current

See also
 List of Massachusetts Senate elections
 List of Massachusetts General Courts
 List of former districts of the Massachusetts Senate
 Bristol County districts of the Massachusetts House of Representatives: 1st, 2nd, 3rd, 4th, 5th, 6th, 7th, 8th, 9th, 10th, 11th, 12th, 13th, 14th
 Plymouth County districts of the Massachusetts House of Representatives: 1st, 2nd, 3rd, 4th, 5th, 6th, 7th, 8th, 9th, 10th, 11th, 12th

References

External links
 Ballotpedia
  (State Senate district information based on U.S. Census Bureau's American Community Survey).

Senate 
Government of Bristol County, Massachusetts
Government of Plymouth County, Massachusetts
Massachusetts Senate